Korngold is a German surname. Notable people with the surname include:

 Julius Korngold (1860–1945), Austrian music critic
 Erich Wolfgang Korngold (1897–1957), Austrian film composer
 George Korngold (1928–1987), Austrian record producer
 Jamie Korngold, American female rabbi

German-language surnames